Richard Johan Anders Malcolm-Hansen (born 22 April 1986), known as Johan Malcolm, is an English-born Danish cricketer. He is a right-handed batsman and a right-arm offbreak bowler who has played internal cricket for Denmark and first-class cricket for Loughborough University and Leicestershire County Cricket Club.

He first played for the Danish cricket team in 2005 in the 2005 Cheltenham & Gloucester Trophy and continued playing for the side until 2007–08. He played for Kent Second XI between 2003 and 2007 in both the Second Eleven Championship and Second Eleven Trophy and plays in the Kent Cricket League for Beckenham Cricket Club. Malcolm played in Denmark's 2005 ICC Trophy campaign. During 2007 he made his first-class cricket debut, for Loughborough UCCE against Yorkshire before joining Leicestershire on an MCC sponsored internship for the 2008 season. He played four matches for the Leicestershire First XI, two in the County Championship and two in the 2008 Pro40 List A cricket competition. He left the county at the end of the 2008 season.

References

External links

1986 births
Danish cricketers
Living people
Loughborough MCCU cricketers
Leicestershire cricketers
People educated at Eltham College